Ansel is a name derived from the same root as Anselm, a medieval Germanic name of uncertain meaning, perhaps view 'follower of a nobleman' or 'with divine protection'. 
Notable people with the name include:

Given name 
Ansel Adams (1902–1984), American photographer and environmentalist
Ansel Briggs (1806–1881), American politician
Ansel Elgort (born 1994), American actor and musician
Ansel Elkins (born 1982), American poet
Ansel Galimov (born 1991), Russian ice hockey player
Ansel Franklin Hall (1894–1962), American naturalist
Ansel Krut (born 1959), South African painter 
Ansel Sterling (1782–1853), American politician
Ansel Talbert (1912–1987), American aviation journalist
Ansel Walling (1824–1896), American politician
Ansel Watrous (1835–1927), American newspaper editor and historian
Ansel Williamson (1806–1881), American thoroughbred horse racing trainer
Ansel Wong (born 1945), Trinidadian cultural and political activist
Edgar Ansel Mowrer (1892–1977), American journalist

Surname 
Dominique Ansel (born 1977), French pastry chef
Elise Ansel (born 1962), American painter
Julius Ansel (1908–1965), American politician 
Karen Ansel, American visual effects designer
Martin Frederick Ansel (1850–1945), American politician
Ruth Ansel (born 1938), American graphic designer
Talvikki Ansel (born 1962), American poet